Ards Upper (named after the former barony of Ards) is a barony in County Down, Northern Ireland. It lies on the southern half of the Ards Peninsula in the east of the county, with the Irish Sea to its east and Strangford Lough to its west. It is bordered by two other baronies: Ards Lower to the north; and Lecale Lower just across the mouth of Strangford Lough to the south.

The barony of Ards Upper was created in 1851 when the barony of Ards was split into two, the other part being Ards Lower.  The territory includes the lands of that part of the ancient barony of Ards known as Mid or Middle Ards, which is located in the north of Ards Upper.

List of settlements
Below is a list of settlements in Ards Upper:

Towns
Portaferry

Villages
Ballyhalbert
Ballywalter
Cloghy
Kircubbin
Portavogie

List of civil parishes
Below is a list of civil parishes in Ards Upper:
Ardkeen
Ardquin
Ballyphilip
Ballytrustan
Ballywalter
Castleboy
Inishargy
Slanes
St. Andrews (alias Ballyhalbert)
Witter

References

 
1851 establishments in Ireland